The University of Santander  (UDES) is a private research university, approved by the Colombian government through the Ministry of Education, according to legal status 810 1996; organized under the provisions of Act 30 of 1992. This university has different locations in Colombia and Latin America being the main campus located in Bucaramanga, other campus are Panama City (Panama), Bogotá, Cúcuta and Valledupar. Provides technical, undergraduate, graduate, postgraduate, and continual education programs.

Undergraduate programs

Technology programs
 Technology Supervision of Civil Works
 Technology Marketing and Advertising
 Technology in Graphic Design Advertising
 Food Technology
 Industry technology
 Systems Technology

Postgraduate programs
 Business Management
 Specialization in Advertising Management
 Audit Specialization in Health Services
 Specialization in Marketing Management
 Specialization in Public Management
 Specialization in Health Services Management
 Specialization in Financial Management
 Specialization in Geotechnical Environmental
 Specialization in Traffic and Transportation Engineering
 Residency program in Critical care
 Master of Arts in Psychoanalytic Research
 Master of Science in Infectious Diseases Research

Affiliated Higher Institutes of Research
Masira Institute for Biomedical Research

References

External links
 http://www.cna.gov.co/1741/article-197026.html
 Universidad de Santander (Bucaramanga)
 Universidad de Santander (Cucuta)
 Universidad de Santander (Valledupar)
 Universidad de Santander (Bogota)
 Campus Virtual UDES
 Ministerio de Educación (COL)

Universities and colleges in Colombia
Microbiology organizations